Merilyn Phillips (born 19 March 1957) is a Caymanian former cyclist. She competed in the women's road race event at the 1984 Summer Olympics. She was the first woman to represent the Cayman Islands at the Olympics.

References

External links
 

1957 births
Living people
Caymanian female cyclists
Olympic cyclists of the Cayman Islands
Cyclists at the 1984 Summer Olympics
Place of birth missing (living people)